John Selwyn Lloyd (born 1931) known professionally as J. Selwyn Lloyd, is a Welsh-language author of novels for children and young adults.

Early life
He was born in Talysarn in the Nantlle Valley, a heavily Welsh-speaking area of North Wales.

Personal life
Lloyd now lives in Corwen.

Awards 

 Tir na n-Og Award in 1977 and 1983
 Tlws y Ddrama at the National Eisteddfod of Wales in 1979 for Ychydig wedi naw.
 Mary Vaughan Jones Award in 2000

Bibliography 

 Owi Tŷ Pella (Hughes, 1960)
 Llam y Lleidr (Hughes, 1967)
 Creithiau'r gorffennol (Gwasg Gomer, 1972)
 Dychweliad y swastika (D. Brown a'i Feibion, 1973)
 Breuddwyd yw ddoe (Gwasg Gomer, 1976)
 Llygad y ddrycin (Gwasg Gwynedd, 1976)
 Trysor Bryniau Caspar (Gwasg Gomer, 1976)
 Esgyrn sychion (Gwasg Gomer, 1977)
 Ychydig wedi naw (Cyngor Gwasanaethau Gwirfoddol Clwyd, 1979)
 Llygad y daran (Gwasg Gomer, 1980)
 Brenin y paith (Gwasg Gomer, 1982)
 Croes bren yn Norwy (Gwasg Gomer, 1982; 2nd ed. 1986)
 Y Saethau duon (Gwasg Gomer 1982)
 Trwy awyr wenfflam (Gwasg Gomer, 1982)
 Wrth draed y meirw (Gwag Gomer, 1982)
 Cysgod rhyfel (Gwasg Gomer, 1983)
 Gwaed ar y dagrau (Gwasg Gomer, 1983; 2nd ed. 1988)
 Saethau ar y paith (Gwasg Gomer, 1983; 2nd ed. 1988)
 Bu farw Mel Polanski (Gwasg Gomer, 1984)
 Y Dylluan wen (Urdd Gobaith Cymru 1984)
 Y Seren Arian (Urdd Gobaith Cymru 1987)
 Trysor yn y Fynwent (Gwasg Gomer, 1988; 2nd ed. 1992)
 Elain (Gwasg Pantycelyn, 1993)
 Y Dyn a'r Groes o Haearn (Gwasg Gwynedd, 1995)
 Cai Jones ac Esgyrn y Diafol (Gwasg Gwynedd, 1989)
 Cai Jones a'r Awyren Goll (Gwasg Gwynedd, 1991)
 Cai Jones a'r Elain Wen (Gwasg Gwynedd, 1994)
 Mudan Porth y Ddraig (Gwasg Gomer, 1991)

Translations 

 Saibhreas Chnoic Chaspair (Irish translation of Trysor Bryniau Caspar by Liam Mac Cóil, Oifig an tSoláthair, 1981)
 The Mute horseman of Dragon's Bay (English translation of Mudan Porth y Ddraig by the author, Pont, 1992)

References 

 1931 births
Welsh-language writers
Welsh novelists
Living people